Steven Scott Cliff is an American chemist and transportation official who last served as administrator of the National Highway Traffic Safety Administration. He also served as deputy executive officer of the California Air Resources Board and assistant director of sustainability in the California Department of Transportation.

Education 
Cliff earned a Bachelor of Science and PhD in chemistry from the University of California, San Diego. He completed post-doctoral studies at the University of California, Davis Department of Land, Air and Water Resources.

Career 
After earning his PhD, Cliff worked as a research professor at the University of California, Davis. He then joined the California Air Resources Board, working as a technical manager for greenhouse gas cap-and-trade policy. He later served as chief of the GHG Market Development and Oversight Branch and assistant division chief of the Climate Program. From 2014 to 2016, he served as assistant director of sustainability in the California Department of Transportation. He later rejoined the California Air Resources Board, serving as a senior advisor to the chair and deputy executive officer. In February 2021, Cliff became a senior advisor at the National Highway Traffic Safety Administration.

Nomination to NHTSA
Cliff was nominated to serve as administrator of the NHTSA on October 19, 2021. On December 16, 2021, the Senate's Commerce Committee held hearings on his nomination. Cliff's nomination ultimately expired at the end of the year and was returned on January 3, 2022. President Biden resent his nomination to the Senate the following day. On February 2, 2022, the committee favorably reported Cliff's nomination to the Senate floor. On May 26, 2022, the United States Senate confirmed his nomination by a voice vote.

References

External links

Living people
University of California, San Diego alumni
University of California, Davis faculty
United States Department of Transportation officials
California Department of Transportation
California Environmental Protection Agency
Year of birth missing (living people)
21st-century American chemists
Biden administration personnel